Bruno Mauricio de Zabala y Gortázar (1682–1736) was a Spanish soldier and colonial administrator who served as governor of the Governorate of the Río de la Plata from 1717 to 1734 and founded the city of Montevideo, capital of present-day Uruguay.

Biography 

Son of a distinguished merchant who made his fortune in the New World, Bruno Mauricio de Zabala was born in Zabala, then located outside the walls of Durango, but now part of the town in the province of Biscay. His birthplace has been preserved to this day, and one of its walls bears two plaques commemorating his military achievements overseas.

In 1717 Zabala was named capitán general of the Río de la Plata, where he suppressed piracy and confronted the Portuguese, who sought to claim the River Plate for themselves. In 1724, to contend with these rivals, Zabala constructed a coastal fortress. This settlement, designated as San Felipe y Santiago de Montevideo, became the center of Spanish control over the Banda Oriental, and later the capital of Uruguay. In 1725 and 1735, Zabala briefly served as interim governor of Paraguay, then part of the Viceroyalty of Peru, where he eventually died of a stroke at the age of 53.

See also 
 Plaza Zabala

References 

Governors of Paraguay
Spanish city founders
Spanish military personnel
Governors of the Río de la Plata
1682 births
1736 deaths
Burials at Buenos Aires Metropolitan Cathedral
History of Uruguay
Viceroyalty of the Río de la Plata
People from Durango, Biscay